Slovakia competed in the 2012 Summer Olympics in London, from 27 July to 12 August 2012. This was the nation's fifth consecutive appearance at the Summer Olympics. The Slovak Olympic Committee sent a total of 47 athletes to the Games, 26 men and 21 women, to compete in 11 sports. There was only a single competitor in badminton, judo, triathlon, and weightlifting.

The Slovak team featured three defending Olympic champions from Beijing: slalom canoers Michal Martikán, and twins Pavol and Peter Hochschorner. Rifle shooter and double bronze medalist Jozef Gönci, who was the nation's flag bearer at the opening ceremony, competed at his sixth Olympics and was the oldest and most experienced athlete, at age 38. Meanwhile, medley swimmer Katarína Listopadová was the youngest member of the team, at age 19. Other notable Slovak athletes included road cyclist and world junior champion Peter Sagan, weightlifter and three-time Olympic veteran Martin Tešovič, and professional tennis player Daniela Hantuchová.

Slovakia left London with a total of four medals (one silver and three bronze), failing to win a gold for the first - and so far, only - time in Olympic history and in the post-Czechoslovak era. Among the nation's medalists were shooters Zuzana Štefečeková and Danka Barteková, who took silver and bronze medals in the women's trap and skeet events respectively. On 11 August 2012, Barteková was elected to the IOC Athletes Commission, along with three other athletes. Meanwhile, Michal Martikán, who won bronze in London, became the most successful Slovak athlete in history with a total of five Olympic medals.

Medalists

| width=78% align=left valign=top |

|width=22% align=left valign=top |

Competitors

| width=78% align=left valign=top |
The following is the list of number of competitors participating in the Games:

| width=22% align=left valign=top |

Athletics

Slovak athletes have so far achieved qualifying standards in the following athletics events (up to a maximum of 3 athletes in each event at the 'A' Standard, and 1 at the 'B' Standard):

Men
Track & road events

Field events

Women
Track & road events

Field events

Badminton

Canoeing

Slalom
Slovakia has qualified boats for the following events

Sprint
Slovakia has qualified boats for the following events

Men

Women

Qualification Legend: FA = Qualify to final (medal); FB = Qualify to final B (non-medal)

Cycling

Slovakia has qualified in the following events

Road

Mountain biking

Gymnastics

Artistic
Men

Women

Judo

Slovakia has qualified 1 judoka

Shooting

Slovakia has earned seven qualification berths in shooting events:

Men

Women

Swimming

Slovakian swimmers have so far achieved qualifying standards in the following events (up to a maximum of 2 swimmers in each event at the Olympic Qualifying Time (OQT), and 1 at the Olympic Selection Time (OST)):

Men

Women

Tennis

Men

Women

Triathlon

Slovakia has qualified the following athletes.

Weightlifting

Slovakia has qualified the following quota places.

References

Nations at the 2012 Summer Olympics
2012
Summer Olympics